John Shaw Glass (5 November 1908 – 1991) was a Scottish footballer who played for Kilmarnock and Dumbarton.

References

1908 births
1991 deaths
Scottish footballers
Dumbarton F.C. players
Kilmarnock F.C. players
Scottish Football League players
Association football wing halves
People from Govan
Benburb F.C. players
Date of death missing